Apremodo is a town in the Western region of Ghana. It is about 8 kilometres from Takoradi   the regional capital. It apart from serving as a dormitory town for many of the workers who work in an around Takoradi, it also serves as a military base for the 2nd Infantry battalion of the Ghana Army. Again, part of the town houses the expanded part of the Market Circle, Takoradi's main market.

Boundary
The town is bounded to the west and south and east by Takoradi, to the north by Kwesimintsim and to the west by Apowa

References

Populated places in the Western Region (Ghana)